Cochliopina compacta is a species of very small freshwater snails that have an operculum, aquatic gastropod mollusks in the family Hydrobiidae, the mud snails. This species is endemic to Mexico.

References

Cochliopina
Gastropods described in 1910
Endemic molluscs of Mexico
Taxonomy articles created by Polbot